Lancaster County  is a county located in the U.S. state of South Carolina. As of the 2020 census, its population was 96,016, Its county seat is Lancaster, which has an urban population of 23,979. The county was created in 1785.

Lancaster County is included in the Charlotte-Concord-Gastonia, NC-SC Metropolitan Statistical Area. It is located in the Piedmont region.

History
For hundreds of years, the Catawba Indians occupied what became organized as Lancaster County as part of their historic tribal lands. The Siouan-speaking Catawba were once considered one of the most powerful Southeastern tribes. The Catawba and other Siouan peoples are believed to have emerged and coalesced as individual tribes in the Southeast. Primarily sedentary, cultivating their own crops, the Catawba were friendly toward the early European colonists.

When the first Anglo-Europeans reached this area in the early 1750s, they settled between Rum Creek and Twelve Mile Creek. Waxhaw Creek within this area was named after the Waxhaw Indian tribe that was prominent in the region. The majority of the new settlers were Scots-Irish who had migrated from Pennsylvania, where they had landed in Philadelphia. Other Scots-Irish from the backcountry of North Carolina and Virginia joined them. A significant minority of the population was German.

Many of the early settlers migrated to South Carolina from Lancaster, Lancashire in the northwest region of England. They had named their county for the House of Lancaster, which had opposed the House of York in the struggles of 1455–85, known as the War of the Roses. The House of Lancaster chose the red rose as their emblem while their neighbor, York County, boasts the white rose.

A second settlement was made in the lower part of the present Lancaster County on Hanging Rock Creek. The South Carolina colony first made a grant to settlers there in 1752; it included the overhanging mass of rock for which the creek was named. About the time the colony opened up this section, other settlers came in and settled along Lynches Creek, Little Lynches creek, Flat Creek, Beaver Creek, and lower Camp Creek. In coming to the Lancaster area, the first settlers followed old Indian paths. The increased traffic began to enlarge the paths and improve them as dirt roads. Several settlers from the regions of Norfolk, England, Suffolk, England and Essex, England arrived in what would later become Lancaster County in the late 1750s. These settlers were overwhelming Baptists, Methodists and Anglicans. After the American Revolution, those who were Anglican became members of the Episcopal Church.

The Rocky River Road was also based on an Indian path. During the American Revolutionary War, Colonel Abraham Buford and his forces fled from Tarleton along this road. He was overtaken a few miles south of the North Carolina state line, where the Patriot forces were defeated in the Battle of Waxhaws. Locals call it Buford's Massacre. Today, the Rocky River Road has been absorbed by part of South Carolina Highway 522, which was constructed following the old thoroughfare very closely.

Geography

It is bounded on the west by the Catawba River and Sugar Creek and on the east by the Lynches River.

State and local protected areas/sites 
 40 Acre Rock Heritage Preserve
 Andrew Jackson State Park
 Buford Battleground
 Hanging Rock Battleground Property
 Historic Craig House
 Landsford Canal State Park

Major water bodies 
 Catawba River
 Fishing Creek Lake
 Flat Rock Creek
 Gills Creek
 Lake Wateree
 Lynches River
 Sugar Creek

Adjacent counties
 Union County, North Carolina - northeast
 Chesterfield County - east
 Kershaw County - south
 Fairfield County - southwest
 York County - west
 Chester County - west
 Mecklenburg County, North Carolina - north

Major highways

Major Infrastructure 
 Lancaster County Airport

Demographics

2020 census

As of the 2020 United States census, there were 96,016 people, 35,410 households, and 24,327 families residing in the county.

2010 census
As of the 2010 United States Census, there were 76,652 people, 29,697 households, and 21,122 families living in the county. The racial makeup of the county was 71.5% white, 23.8% black or African American, 0.6% Asian, 0.3% American Indian, 2.4% from other races, and 1.3% from two or more races. Those of Hispanic or Latino origin made up 4.4% of the population. In terms of ancestry, 23.9% were American, 8.0% were Irish, 7.6% were English, and 7.2% were German.

Of the 29,697 households, 33.2% had children under the age of 18 living with them, 51.0% were married couples living together, 15.4% had a female householder with no husband present, 28.9% were non-families, and 24.7% of all households were made up of individuals. The average household size was 2.51 and the average family size was 2.97. The median age was 39.7 years.

The median income for a household in the county was $38,959 and the median income for a family was $46,388. Males had a median income of $39,681 versus $28,985 for females. The per capita income for the county was $19,308. About 15.8% of families and 20.4% of the population were below the poverty line, including 30.2% of those under age 18 and 11.2% of those age 65 or over.

2000 census
As of the census of 2000, there were 61,351 people, 23,178 households, and 16,850 families living in the county. There were 24,962 housing units at an average density of 46 per square mile (18/km2). The racial makeup of the county was 71.03% White American, 26.86% African American, 0.22% Native American, 0.27% Asian American, 0.02% Pacific Islander, 0.89% from other races, and 0.71% from two or more races. 1.59% of the population were Hispanic or Latino of any race.

There were 23,178 households, out of which 33.40% had children under the age of 18 living with them, 52.60% were married couples living together, 15.50% had a female householder with no husband present, and 27.30% were non-families. 23.70% of all households were made up of individuals, and 9.40% had someone living alone who was 65 years of age or older. The average household size was 2.56 and the average family size was 3.01.

In the county, the population was spread out, with 25.40% under the age of 18, 8.60% from 18 to 24, 30.30% from 25 to 44, 23.60% from 45 to 64, and 12.10% who were 65 years of age or older. The median age was 36 years. For every 100 females there were 98.20 males. For every 100 females age 18 and over, there were 95.40 males.

The median income for a household in the county was $34,688, and the median income for a family was $40,955. Males had a median income of $30,176 versus $22,238 for females. The per capita income for the county was $16,276. About 9.70% of families and 12.80% of the population were below the poverty threshold, including 16.50% of those under age 18 and 15.80% of those age 65 or over.

Government and politics

Communities

City
 Lancaster (county seat and largest city)

Towns
 Heath Springs
 Kershaw
 Van Wyck

Census-designated places
 Buford
 Elgin
 Irwin
 Lancaster Mill (former CDP)
 Springdale
 Tradesville
 Unity

Other unincorporated communities
 Indian Land
 Taxahaw

Notable people
 Bill Belk, professional football player (San Francisco 49ers)
 Sheldon Brown, professional football player
 Wayne A. Cauthen, first appointed African-American City Manager, Kansas City, MO
 Danny Clyburn, professional baseball player (Baltimore Orioles, Tampa Bay Devil Rays, Pittsburgh Pirates)
 Shawn Crawford, sprinter and Olympic gold medalist
 Don Dixon, record producer, songwriter, musician
 Charles Duke, astronaut and moon-walker
 James "Butch" Duncan, Professional NFL Baltimore Colts player Super Bowl V
 Pep Harris, professional baseball player (Cleveland Indians, Anaheim Angels)
 Jim Hodges, former Governor of South Carolina
 Andrew Jackson, seventh President of the United States
 Nina Mae McKinney, actress and Broadway star
 Todd Ray, aka 'T-Ray', Grammy Award-winning record producer
 Julie Roberts, country music singer
 Aaron Robinson, Major League Baseball player (New York Yankees, Detroit Tigers, Chicago White Sox, Boston Red Sox)
 Darrell Shropshire, professional football player
 Nelson Sullivan, video artist and 1980s Club Kids personality.
 J. Marion Sims, surgeon known as the "Father of Modern Gynecology"
 The Zodiacs, led by Maurice Williams, R&B vocal group
 Jeff Twitty, professional baseball player (Kansas City Royals)
 Brian Williams, professional baseball player (Houston Astros, Detroit Tigers, Baltimore Orioles, Chicago Cubs, Boston Red Sox)

See also
 List of counties in South Carolina
 National Register of Historic Places listings in Lancaster County, South Carolina
 South Carolina State Parks

References

External links

 
 
 Lancaster County Chamber of Commerce
 Lancaster County School District
 Lancaster County History and Images

 
1785 establishments in South Carolina
Populated places established in 1785